William Leo Franklyn (22 September 1925 – 31 October 2006) was a British actor, perhaps best known for voicing the "Schhh... You Know Who" adverts for Schweppes from 1965 to 1973. He also performed on stage, film, television and radio, taking over from Peter Jones as "The Book" (the narrator) in the third, fourth and fifth radio series of The Hitchhiker's Guide to the Galaxy. He is also known for his portrayal of Sexton Blake for BBC Radio 4 in 1967.

Early life
Franklyn was born in Kensington into an acting family: his maternal grandfather, Arthur Rigby, Sr and uncle, Arthur Rigby, Jr, mother, Mary Rigby, and father, Leo Franklyn, were all actors. He was taken to Australia as a baby, where his father toured with musical comedies. The young Franklyn attended Wesley and Haileybury Colleges, both in Melbourne, and developed an abiding love of cricket. He later trialled as a fast bowler for Essex, and opened the bowling for the Stage Cricket Club. He also became a leg spinner, and ran his own team, the Sargentmen, raising money for the Malcolm Sargent Cancer Fund for Children.

He returned to London, aged 11. He was evacuated to Luscombe Castle in Devon in the Second World War. His stage career began at the age of 18, when he appeared in My Sister Eileen at the Savoy Theatre in 1943. He was called up to join the Parachute Regiment, and was sent to Palestine.

Career
He appeared in Arsenic and Old Lace at Southsea Pier in 1946, soon after he was demobilised, and settled on an acting career. He continued to tour with the play in repertory for six years. In a slow period, he traded as an antiques dealer, taking junk away on a barrow from rich areas of London and selling it as antiques.

He went on to perform on the stage, on television and radio, and in several films. He appeared in several films in the 1950s, including Quatermass 2 in 1957, and took a starring role in the 1961 film Pit of Darkness which was the B-feature shown with Adam Faith's What A Whopper. He featured in the 1965 Morecambe and Wise film The Intelligence Men.

He appeared in London's West End in comedies such as There's a Girl in My Soup and Tunnel of Love. After perfunctory Italian lessons, he directed a version of There's a Girl in My Soup in Italy, with Italian actors, in Italian. On television, he was a panellist on game shows such as What's My Line? and Call My Bluff. He played Jacques Fleury in The Adventures of the Scarlet Pimpernel (1955–56) and Peter Dallas in the spy drama series Top Secret (1961–62), and also appeared in several episodes of The Avengers.

Franklyn also was in comedy sketch show What's on Next and was the host of espionage quiz game The Masterspy. He was featured on This Is Your Life (1978), appeared in the 1984 comedy television series The Steam Video Company, and in G.B.H. (1991) and Diana: Her True Story (1993).

He was also known for commercial voice-over work; he appeared on screen in 10 commercials and voiced another 40 from 1965 to 1973. The "Schhh... You Know Who" Schweppes adverts Franklyn voiced were created by Ogilvy and Mather.

He voiced Danger Mouse in the unbroadcast pilot for the British television series (although David Jason replaced him in all broadcast episodes).

On radio, he was the reader of the quotes on BBC Radio 4's Quote Unquote for 11 years, until shortly before his death, and also read for The News Quiz. In 2004 and 2005 he took over the role of "The Book" (the narrator) from his friend Peter Jones for the third, fourth and fifth radio series of The Hitchhiker's Guide to the Galaxy.

Filmography

Personal life
Franklyn was married twice: first to Margo Johns in 1952; they had a daughter, actress Sabina Franklyn, but were divorced in 1962. He remarried in 1969; he and his second wife, Susanna, had two daughters, Francesca Franklyn, a film producer, and Melissa Franklyn, an actress.

Franklyn died of prostate cancer on Tuesday, 31 October 2006. His funeral was held on Monday, 6 November 2006 at Mortlake Crematorium, Richmond-Upon-Thames, England.

References

External links

Obituary, BBC News, 31 October 2006
Obituary, The Daily Telegraph, 1 November 2006
Obituary, The Guardian, 1 November 2006
Obituary, The Independent, 1 November 2006
Obituary, The Times, 31 October 2006
, "TV.com Danger mouse cast", 31 May 2010

1925 births
2006 deaths
English male film actors
English radio personalities
English male stage actors
English male television actors
English male voice actors
People from Kensington
Deaths from prostate cancer
Male actors from London
Deaths from cancer in England
People educated at Haileybury (Melbourne)
People educated at Wesley College (Victoria)
British Army personnel of World War II
British Parachute Regiment soldiers